Lay may refer to:

Places
Lay Range, a subrange of mountains in British Columbia, Canada
Lay, Loire, a French commune
Lay (river), France
Lay, Iran, a village
Lay, Kansas, United States, an unincorporated community

People
 Lay (surname)
 Lay Raksmey (born 1989), Cambodian footballer
 Lay Zhang, Chinese rapper, music producer, actor, and member of the K-pop boy group Exo

Poetry 
 A short ballad or lyrical poem
 Heroic lay, a Germanic work of narrative verse
 Breton lay
 lai (poetic form), a medieval French lay

Other uses
 Lay Dam, Alabama, United States
 Lea (unit), obsolete unit of length sometimes spelled "Lay"
 LA-Y, Yoshinobu Launch Complex, in Tanegashima, Japan
 A characteristic of material surface finish
 In betting, see Betting exchange § Backing and laying

See also

 Lay's, a potato-chip brand name and company
 Laity
 Ley (disambiguation)
 Lai (disambiguation)